The MR 41 is a French-built thermonuclear warhead to be launched with the M1 and M2 missiles in Redoutable class ballistic missile submarines.

It had a yield of 500 kilotons and was boosted fission warhead based on highly enriched uranium combined with deuterium and tritium.

Entering service in 1972 it was withdrawn from service by the end of 1979, being replaced by TN 60 warheads.

See also 
 force de frappe
 FOST
 nuclear tests by France

Nuclear warheads of France
Military equipment introduced in the 1970s